Mississippi Gambler is an album by jazz flautist Herbie Mann, released in 1972 on the Atlantic Records label. The album features saxophonist David Newman.

Track listing

Side one
"Swing Low, Sweet Chariot" (Traditional, arranged by Mann) (5:27)
"Mississippi Gambler" (Mann) (6:30)
"Dippermouth" (Mann) (8:50)

Side two
"Respect Yourself" (Mack Rice, Luther Ingram) (5:28)
"I've Been Loving You Too Long" (Otis Redding, Jerry Butler) (5:47)
"(I Can't Get No) Satisfaction" (Mick Jagger, Keith Richards) (6:49)

Personnel
Herbie Mann – flute (including all flute solos)
David Newman – tenor saxophone and flute
Reggie Young – guitar (including all guitar solos)
Johnny Christopher – guitar
Bobby Wood – electric piano
Bobby Emmons – organ
Mike Leech – Fender bass
Gene Chrisman – drums
Carlos "Patato" Valdes – conga drums
Technical
Jim Manos - cover artwork
Joel Brodsky – inside photo
Arif Mardin  – producer
Stan Kesler - recording engineer
Jimmy Douglass - remix engineer

Charting
The album reached #6 on Billboard magazine's Jazz Album chart.

References

Mississippi Gambler, Herbie Mann, Atlantic Records SD1610 (1972) (liner notes)

External links
Mississippi Gambler at Allmusic.com

Herbie Mann albums
1972 albums
David "Fathead" Newman albums
Albums produced by Arif Mardin
Atlantic Records albums